Benjamin Robert Alnwick (born 1 January 1987) is an English professional footballer who plays as a goalkeeper. Currently unattached, he last played for EFL League 1 team Bolton Wanderers.

Alnwick started his career at Sunderland in 2004, having progressed through the club's youth ranks, but never fully established himself in the first team. He left for Tottenham Hotspur in January 2007, having made 19 league appearances, but never made more than a single league appearance for Tottenham. Instead, he spent several loan spells away from the club, at Luton Town, Leicester City, Carlisle United, Norwich City, Leeds United, Doncaster Rovers and Leyton Orient. He switched permanently to Barnsley in July 2012, and made 12 appearances, but was deemed surplus to requirements in September 2013, and his contract was terminated by mutual consent.

Alnwick has represented England at under-16, under-17, under-18, under-19 and under-21 levels.

Club career

Sunderland
Alnwick was born in the small Northumberland town of Prudhoe. He spent his boyhood years playing for the Prudhoe youth side. He started his professional career at Sunderland, and came to prominence at the climax of their 2004–05 Football League Championship-winning season, replacing the injured Thomas Myhre for Sunderland's last three games. His performances against Leicester City and West Ham United, the games that won Sunderland promotion to the Premier League and Championship win respectively, were impressive. In November 2005, he spent a stint as the number one goalkeeper at Sunderland, replacing Kelvin Davis. Despite impressing, particularly in Sunderland's 3–2 defeat to Tottenham Hotspur where he made a penalty save from Robbie Keane, Alnwick was dropped in favour of Kelvin Davis. After the departure of Davis to Southampton, Alnwick was given the number 1 shirt for the 2006–07 season.

After a disappointing start to the season 2006–07 season, Alnwick was relegated to the substitutes bench in favour of Darren Ward by new boss Roy Keane.

Tottenham Hotspur
Just two days after the January 2007 transfer window had opened, Alnwick joined Tottenham Hotspur for a fee of £900,000 in a deal that could rise to £1.3 million and saw Márton Fülöp going the other way for £500,000.

Loan moves
In September 2007 he was loaned to League One side Luton Town on a three-month loan deal. He was recalled from Luton in October, due to an injury to Paul Robinson. However, on 7 January 2008, Alnwick joined Leicester City on loan until the end of the season.

Alnwick made his league debut in an M69 Derby on 12 January, keeping a clean sheet as Leicester won 2–0 at the Walkers Stadium. He kept four clean sheets in eight league games, conceding six goals before suffering a thigh injury as Leicester were relegated from the Championship.

On 16 October 2008, Alnwick joined League One side Carlisle United on an initial one-month loan deal and was recalled by Tottenham after the one-month loan ended to become another serious option for the first team goal-keeper position.

Return to Tottenham Hotspur
Alnwick made his debut for Tottenham in a League Cup semi-final second leg against Burnley, which ended in a 3–2 loss, although Tottenham won 6–4 on aggregate.

Loan to Norwich City
In July 2009, he signed on loan at Norwich City for three months. Alnwick made his debut in the 4–0 win over Yeovil Town and kept a clean sheet. He returned to Tottenham on 5 September after picking up a hip injury that was expected to keep him out for six weeks.

Return to Tottenham
His first Premier League game for Tottenham was at Burnley on the final day of the 2009–10 season, 9 May; he conceded four goals as Burnley won 4–2.

More loan moves
On 14 October 2010, Alnwick joined Leeds United on loan for 28 days. Alnwick was named on the bench against Middlesbrough and Leicester City.

Alnwick moved to Doncaster Rovers on 4 March 2011 and stayed until 9 April 2011 after their goalkeeper Neil Sullivan became injured. He was an unused sub in games against Leeds United and Coventry City. Later in the year, he made eight appearances on loan for Leyton Orient.

Barnsley
On 4 July 2012, Alnwick moved to Barnsley on a two-year contract. Alnwick made his Barnsley début on 11 August 2012 in a League Cup tie away at Rochdale. With Barnsley leading 2–1 at 90 mins Alnwick conceded a penalty and was sent off. The penalty was subsequently scored moving the game into extra game. however Barnsley went on to win regardless. On 28 August 2012, he returned to action in the following league cup tie in a 3–1 away defeat to Swansea. Alnwick played his first Championship match of the season in a 1–0 victory over Bristol City on 1 September 2012. However, after the signings of Mike Pollitt and Christian Dibble, Alnwick's contract was terminated by mutual consent on 2 September 2013.

Charlton Athletic
On 4 September 2013, Alnwick signed a one-year contract for Charlton Athletic. He made his debut in a game against Doncaster Rovers after Ben Hamer was injured during the warm up. He managed to keep a clean sheet in a game that Charlton won 2–0.

Leyton Orient
On 31 January 2014, Alnwick joined Leyton Orient. However, a week later, it was announced that Alnwick was suffering from unspecified medical problems, and was unable to train or play. On 24 March 2014, Alnwick left Leyton Orient by mutual consent after having his contract cancelled.

Peterborough United
On 25 July 2014, Alnwick signed a three-year deal at Peterborough United.

On 29 August 2016, Peterborough United placed Alnwick on the transfer list. The 29-year-old informed manager Grant McCann that he wished to go on the list for personal reasons. Two days later, club chairman Darragh MacAnthony announced that the club had accepted Alnwick's request for his contract to be cancelled.

Bolton Wanderers
On the same day he left Peterborough, it was confirmed that Alnwick had moved to fellow Football League One side Bolton Wanderers on a free transfer to offer competition for Mark Howard. At the end of the 2017–18 season it was announced that Alnwick had been named the Bolton Wanderers Player of the Year by the club's supporters. Having played no games for Bolton for the first half of the 2019–20 season, Alnwick decided in December to mutually agree with the club to terminate his contract with immediate effect. Alnwick hadn't been available for selection during Keith Hill's reign.

International career
Alnwick received his first call-up to the England under-21 squad ahead of 15 August 2006 match against Moldova. Still awaiting his debut, Alnwick was named in Stuart Pearce's first squad as England under-21 coach, alongside another uncapped goalkeeper, Joe Hart. He was not chosen to start the match, on 6 February 2007, against Spain.

Alnwick was named in the first England U21 squad to play at the new Wembley against Italy U21s on 24 March 2007, but he remained an unused sub. He was also named in England's squad for the U21 European Championships in the Netherlands. He debuted a year after his first call-up, in a friendly against Romania at Ashton Gate. He came on for the second half as a substitute for Joe Hart, and kept a clean sheet.

Personal life
His younger brother Jak, a goalkeeper for Cardiff City, was at the Prudhoe local youth clubs and the Sunderland youth academy but joined North East rivals Newcastle United as a first year scholar in 2008. Jak won Newcastle's "Wor Jackie" award (named after Jackie Milburn) for best under-18 player in 2011. The pair played against each other in a 1–1 draw between Port Vale and Peterborough United on 17 October 2015.

Alnwick has been in an on-off relationship with his childhood sweetheart since 2007.

Career statistics

Honours
Bolton Wanderers
EFL League One runner-up: 2016–17

References

External links

1987 births
Living people
People from Prudhoe
Footballers from Northumberland
English footballers
England under-21 international footballers
Association football goalkeepers
Sunderland A.F.C. players
Tottenham Hotspur F.C. players
Luton Town F.C. players
Leicester City F.C. players
Carlisle United F.C. players
Norwich City F.C. players
Leeds United F.C. players
Doncaster Rovers F.C. players
Leyton Orient F.C. players
Barnsley F.C. players
Charlton Athletic F.C. players
Peterborough United F.C. players
Bolton Wanderers F.C. players
Premier League players
English Football League players
England youth international footballers